Darby Phyllis Mills is a Canadian rock vocalist, former figure skater, and the past lead singer of the Headpins. She has embarked on a solo career, having signed a worldwide record contract and released both a remastered solo album and a live CD.

History
Born on 1959 in Vernon, British Columbia, Mills began singing back-up vocals for Canadian bands in the late 1970s, most notably the British Columbia-based band Steelback.

After signing on with the Headpins in 1981, the group began a three-album run at the top of the Canadian charts. Their debut album "Turn It Loud", quickly went platinum and topped the charts for six weeks. It spawned the hit single "Don't It Make Ya Feel". Their follow-up, "Line of Fire", produced the hits "Celebration" and "Just One More Time". The Headpins toured Europe and North America while opening for bands such as KISS, Whitesnake, ZZ Top and Aerosmith, among others.

Mills released her debut solo LP, Never Look Back, backed by the Unsung Heroes.

She returned to re-form the Headpins with Bernie Aubin and Ab Bryant a year or so later, without guitarist Brian MacLeod. In 2005, Mills was nominated for a star on Canada's Walk of Fame.

Darby has been married to her husband Brian Wadsworth since the mid 80s and has 2 sons Clayton and Parker.  When not on tour, Mills teaches tae kwon do.

References

External links
Official website

Canadian women rock singers
Living people
People from Vernon, British Columbia
Year of birth missing (living people)
20th-century Canadian women singers
21st-century Canadian women singers